Seythenex is a former commune in the Haute-Savoie department in the Auvergne-Rhône-Alpes region in south-eastern France. On 1 January 2016, it was merged into the new commune of Faverges-Seythenex. Its population was 665 in 2018.

See also
Communes of the Haute-Savoie department

References

Former communes of Haute-Savoie
Populated places disestablished in 2016